The Crandall Houses at 112 and 136 E. 200 North in Springville, Utah are listed on the National Register of Historic Places. They are the Clarence L. Crandall House and the Nelson D. Crandall House.  The houses were both built in 1900, and are twin houses that look virtually identical.  The designs appear to be adapted from pattern books circulating around that time.  The design of the houses reflects the Victorian ideal of adapting high-style architecture to vernacular style homes.  The Queen Anne-style trim, in particular, is unique within Springville.

References

Houses completed in 1900
Houses on the National Register of Historic Places in Utah
Houses in Utah County, Utah
Victorian architecture in Utah
National Register of Historic Places in Utah County, Utah
Buildings and structures in Springville, Utah
Individually listed contributing properties to historic districts on the National Register in Utah